Grey matter is a component of the central nervous system.

Grey Matter may also refer to:

Music
 Gray Matter (band)
 Grey Matter (album), by Wool on Wolves
 "Grey Matter", a song by Oingo Boingo on the album Nothing to Fear

Film and television
 Grey Matter (film)
 "Gray Matter" (Breaking Bad)
 Grey Matter (Ben 10), a Ben 10 character
 Grey Matter (short film), earned director Sahar Jahani an award in 2017

Other uses
 Gray Matter (video game)
 "Gray Matter" (short story), by Stephen King
 Gray Matter Studios, a defunct American video game developer
 Gray Matter (company), a defunct Canadian video game developer
 Greymatter (software), a blogging program

See also
 Gray Matters (disambiguation)